Quick Brown Fox and Rapid Rabbit were a pair of Warner Bros. cartoon characters, created by Robert McKimson, who appeared in only one cartoon, Rabbit Stew and Rabbits Too! Future cartoons featuring the characters were planned, but were cancelled following the shutdown of Warner Bros.-Seven Arts Animation on October 10, 1969.

Characters
 Quick Brown Fox, a pantomime character, is a fox who wants to eat the fast-running rabbit, but consistently fails to catch him despite using a variety of traps and devices. The fox's name is derived from the popular pangram, "The quick brown fox jumps over the lazy dog." He is inspired by Wile E. Coyote, a famed Looney Tunes character created by Chuck Jones.
 Rapid Rabbit, a small brown rabbit (who's not to be confused with the much later Rapid T. Rabbit), is every bit as fast as his name implies; another pantomime character, he never says a word, but uses a bicycle horn to express himself. He is inspired by the Road Runner, another Looney Tunes character who is the aforementioned Wile E. Coyote's co-star; also created by Chuck Jones, and in part by Bugs Bunny's occasional appearances as Wile E. Coyote's foil (Warner Bros. had retired Bugs in 1964).

Cartoon
Rabbit Stew and Rabbits Too! is a 1969 theatrically-released cartoon, one of the last few cartoons of the Looney Tunes series (which, at that time, was owned by Warner Bros.-Seven Arts). It was a "chase" cartoon along the same lines as the Wile E. Coyote and Road Runner cartoons; a predator tries and fails to catch his intended prey, despite using a number of ingenious or comically absurd traps. It was intended to be the first of a series of Rapid Rabbit cartoons which had been planned, but no more were produced as the animation department folded soon after its release.

Synopsis
Quick Brown Fox wants to make rabbit stew, with the elusive Rapid Rabbit as the main ingredient. To this end, he tries several different traps — simple ones at first, but they gradually become ridiculously elaborate — and all of them fail to ensnare Rapid, and some of them end up hurting Quick - some including a spring-loaded hammer set to whack Rapid when he grabs a carrot tied to the trap (Rapid struggles to grab the carrot, resulting in an impatient Quick unintentionally setting the trap off), and a "Free Trip to the Moon" via a cannon, that is also unintentionally set off by Quick - which results in him getting shot into the air and then hit on the head with a cannonball. Ultimately, Quick sets up the most elaborate trap of them all, a large Rube Goldberg-style contraption that will land Rapid into a heated frying pan, positioned next to a dining table for convenience. However, Rapid uses his horn to startle Quick, who takes a short leap backwards in surprise, lands into the contraption's trigger, and ends up suffering everything his trap has to offer, finally landing flat onto the table, breaking it apart. Rapid finishes the job by bundling Quick in the tablecloth  and tying a helium balloon to the cloth’s corners, lifting Quick into the sky.

References

External links
 Rapid Rabbit at Don Markstein's Toonopedia
 
 

Looney Tunes characters
Animated films about foxes
Animated films about rabbits and hares
1960s English-language films
1960s American films